Lecithocera fascitiala is a moth in the family Lecithoceridae. It was described by Kyu-Tek Park in 2012 and is endemic to Papua New Guinea.

Etymology
The species name is derived from Latin  (meaning banded) and ala (meaning wing) and refers to the whitish fascia dividing the forewing.

References

Moths described in 2012
Endemic fauna of Papua New Guinea
fascitiala